Luis Alberto Ortiz (born May 25, 1970) is a Dominican professional baseball coach and former player. He played in Major League Baseball (MLB) from 1993 to 1996 for the Boston Red Sox and Texas Rangers. He is currently an assistant hitting coach with the Red Sox.

Playing career
Ortiz played three seasons at Union University in Jackson, Tennessee. He was drafted by the Boston Red Sox in the 8th round of the 1991 MLB draft.

Ortiz played in minor league systems of the Red Sox, Texas Rangers, Arizona Diamondbacks, Montreal Expos and St. Louis Cardinals from 1991 to 2004.

In a four-season MLB career, Ortiz was a .228 hitter (33-for-145) with two home runs and 26 RBI in 60 games, including 14 runs, seven doubles and three triples.

Following his time in MLB, Ortiz played in Nippon Professional Baseball with the 1997 Yakult Swallows.

Coaching career
After retiring from baseball, Ortiz opened a baseball school in Keller, Texas, called Swing City.  He has published four hitting books; The Natural Hitter Handbook, plus three drills books.

Ortiz started his professional coaching career in the Texas Rangers organization as a coach for the Spokane Indians in 2008. He was a roving hitting coordinator in the Rangers' system from 2009 through 2011. In 2012, he was promoted to assistant hitting coordinator. Ortiz was let go from the Rangers organization after Tim Purpura was brought in by Nolan Ryan to run the Rangers player development system.

Ortiz was the lower-level hitting coordinator and the cultural development coordinator for the Cleveland Indians in 2013. In 2014, Ortiz was promoted to assistant field coordinator while performing the role of hitting coordinator.

Ortiz joined the San Diego Padres, and from 2015 through 2017 served as their minor-league field and hitting coordinator. Ortiz was named the interim major league hitting coach of the Padres for the final month of the 2017 season, after Alan Zinter was fired.

On December 1, 2017, Ortiz was hired by the Los Angeles Dodgers to share the dual role of assistant major league hitting coach/minor league hitting coordinator with Brant Brown. He spent the 2018 season in that role.

On November 14, 2018, Ortiz was named the hitting coach of the Texas Rangers, joining new manager Chris Woodward's staff. Ortiz was let go by Texas following the 2021 season.

In December 2021, Ortiz was named an assisting hitting coach for the Boston Red Sox.

Personal life
Ortiz went back to school and graduated from Union University in Jackson, Tennessee with a Bachelor of Science in Physical Education & Health, with a minor in Management & Marketing. In doing so, he became the first player from the Dominican Republic to both play in MLB and graduate from college. Ortiz is married to his wife Susan, whom he met while at Union University, and they have four daughters, Gabriela, Naomi, Samantha, and Moriah.

References

External links

1970 births
Living people
Boston Red Sox players
Dominican Republic baseball coaches
Dominican Republic expatriate baseball players in Canada
Dominican Republic expatriate baseball players in Japan
Dominican Republic expatriate baseball players in Mexico
Dominican Republic expatriate baseball players in the United States
Edmonton Trappers players
Major League Baseball hitting coaches
Major League Baseball players from the Dominican Republic
Major League Baseball third basemen
Memphis Redbirds players
Mexican League baseball first basemen
Mexican League baseball second basemen
Mexican League baseball third basemen
Nippon Professional Baseball infielders
Oklahoma City 89ers players
Olmecas de Tabasco players
Omaha Royals players
Ottawa Lynx players
Pawtucket Red Sox players
San Diego Padres coaches
Sportspeople from Santo Domingo
Sultanes de Monterrey players
Texas Rangers coaches
Texas Rangers players
Tucson Sidewinders players
Union Bulldogs baseball players
Winnipeg Goldeyes players
Yakult Swallows players